Lauren Groff (born July 23, 1978) is an American novelist and short story writer. She has written four novels and two short story collections, including Fates and Furies (2015), Florida (2018), and Matrix (2021).

Early life and education
Groff was born and raised in Cooperstown, New York. She graduated from Amherst College and from the University of Wisconsin–Madison with a Master of Fine Arts degree in fiction.

Career
Groff's first novel, The Monsters of Templeton, was published by Hyperion on February 5, 2008, and debuted on the New York Times bestseller list. It was well received by Stephen King, who read it before publication and wrote an early review in Entertainment Weekly. The novel was shortlisted for the Orange Prize for New Writers in 2008, and named one of the Best Books of 2008 by Amazon.com and the San Francisco Chronicle.

The Monsters of Templeton is a contemporary tale about coming home to Templeton, a representation of Cooperstown, New York. It is interspersed with voices from characters drawn from the town's history as well as James Fenimore Cooper's The Pioneers, which is also set in a fictionalized Cooperstown called Templeton.
 
Groff's first collection of short stories, Delicate Edible Birds, was released in January 2009. It featured stories published in The New Yorker, The Atlantic, Five Points, Ploughshares, and the anthologies Best New American Voices 2008, Pushcart Prize XXXII, and Best American Short Stories 2007, 2010, and 2014 editions.

Groff's second novel, Arcadia, was released in 2012 and tells the story of the first child born in a fictional 1960s commune in upstate New York. A New York Times and Booksense bestseller, it received favorable reviews from the New York Times Sunday Book Review, The Washington Post, and The Miami Herald. The novel was recognized as one of the Best Books of 2012 by The New York Times, The Washington Post, NPR, Vogue, The Globe and Mail, Christian Science Monitor, and Kirkus Reviews.

Her third novel, Fates and Furies, was released in 2015 and was also a New York Times and Booksense bestseller. Fates and Furies is a portrait of a 24-year marriage from two points of view, first the husband's and then the wife's. It was nominated for the 2015 National Book Award for Fiction, the 2015 National Book Critics Circle Award for Fiction, and was featured in numerous "Best of 2015" fiction lists, including the selection by Amazon.com as the Best Book of 2015. President Barack Obama chose it as his favorite book of 2015.

In 2017, Granta Magazine named Groff one of the Best of Young American Novelists of her generation. In 2018, she received a Guggenheim Fellowship in Fiction.

Groff's fifth book, a short story collection titled Florida, was released in 2018. Florida was the winner of The Story Prize for short story collections published in 2018. It was also a finalist for the 2018 National Book Award for Fiction. The Guardian called Groff's storytelling "a heroic pushback against the way we live now, against waste, against the artificial environments in which we find ourselves maintained by corporations, but equally against the pressures on women to be flawless, effortlessly excellent mothers, wives, sisters, lovers, friends, within this dire state of affairs."

Groff's fourth novel, Matrix, was released in 2021. Matrix is about a "seventeen-year-old Marie de France... sent to England to be the new prioress of an impoverished abbey, its nuns on the brink of starvation and beset by disease." The Observer called it "a strange and poetic piece of historical fiction set in a dreamlike abbey, the fictional biography of a 12th-century mystic." Matrix was shortlisted for the 2021 National Book Award for Fiction and the 2022 Andrew Carnegie Medal for Excellence in Fiction.

Personal life
Groff is married with two children and lives in Gainesville, Florida. Her sister is the Olympic triathlete Sarah True.

Bibliography

Novels
The Monsters of Templeton (William Heinemann, 2008)
Arcadia (Hachette, 2012)
Fates and Furies (William Heinemann, 2015)
Matrix (William Heinemann, 2021)

Short fiction

Collections
Delicate Edible Birds (2009)
 Florida (New York: Riverhead Books, 2018)

List of short stories

Critical studies and reviews of Groff's work
Florida

References

External links
Official Website

1978 births
Living people
American women short story writers
People from Cooperstown, New York
21st-century American novelists
American women novelists
Novelists from New York (state)
21st-century American women writers
Amherst College alumni
University of Wisconsin–Madison alumni
21st-century American short story writers
The New Yorker people
Writers from Gainesville, Florida